Fariborz Raisdana (19 January 1945 – 16 March 2020) was an Iranian economist, socialist, activist, professor, and a member of the Iranian Writers' Association (Persian: کانون نویسندگان ایران). He was the author of numerous articles and books, including Applied Development Economics; Money and Inflation; Political Economy of Development, and Globalization.

Early life
Raisdana was born in Tehran on January 19, 1945. His father, Haji Khan, was a Lab Doctor in Tehran and was originally from Ebrahimabad (Buin Zahra) and as such Fariborz would spend most of the summers during his early years in Ebrahimabad. He would later attend Molavi Elementary and Hakim Nezami High School in Tehran. Being the child of a "Khan" and his easy and happy upbringing in Tehran and even in his ancestral Village of Ebrahimabad as opposed to the widespread poverty and hardship in Imperial Iran was the primary reason he became interested in topics of social injustice.

Raisdana spent his teenage years in a political climate surrounded by the Oil Nationalization Movement and the 28 Mordad coup d'état. He was arrested multiple times for his involvement and membership in the Second National Front.

Education 
Raisdana acquired his Bachelor's and Master's in Economics and Econometrics from the Iranian National University. Following his graduation, he spent a few years instructing in a few different universities. He continued his teaching and instruction until his arrest, when he was forced to leave the country. Due to the ideological shifts in the National Front, Raisdana had changed his perception and connections with the movement and had instead become interested in more left-leaning political movements of Iran. His arrest was also due to SAVAK's persecution of Iranian Socialist and Marxists at the time. He would later use a fake passport to travel to Germany, Turkey, Lebanon, Bulgaria, and England.

Raisdana continued his education in London School of Economics where he would graduate with a PhD in Economics.

Arrests 
Raisdana was arrested on 21 March 2012 in Tehran after criticizing the Iranian subsidy reform plan in an interview with BBC Persian and given a one-year sentence at Evin Prison, for a series of charges including "membership in the Writer's Association, preparing seditious announcements against the regime, giving interviews to BBC and VOA, and accusing the Islamic Republic of abusing prisoners and holding show trials". Individuals and associations such as the Iranian Writers' Association, The Middle East Economic Association, and The Workers' Rights Defenders spoke out against his arrest.

Raisdana died on 16 March 2020 because of COVID-19 complications in Tehran Pars hospital after spending six days in the hospital. He was buried in his birthplace, Ebrahimabad.

Bibliography

Author

Translation

References 

1945 births
2020 deaths
Iranian socialists
Iranian economists
Prisoners and detainees of Iran
National Front (Iran) student activists
Iranian Writers Association members
Deaths from the COVID-19 pandemic in Iran